The FC Vilshofen is a German association football club from the town of Vilshofen an der Donau, Bavaria.

The club's most successful era was from 1978 to 1985, when it spent six seasons in the tier three Fußball-Bayernliga, with a ninth place in this league as its best result. The club also reached the first round of the German Cup in 1979–80, where it lost 2–3 to FV Würzburg 04 after extra time.

The club's youth team twice reached the final of the Bavarian Under 19 championship in the 1970s and produced players like former German international Klaus Augenthaler.

History
FC Vilshofen was formed in 1919.

The club rose above local play in 1973, when it achieved promotion to the tier four Landesliga Bayern-Mitte. In this league, FCV spent the next five seasons, the first three of them struggling against relegation before taking out the league championship in 1977–78 and gaining entry to the Bayernliga. The club's first two seasons at this level were however a struggle and it was relegated at the end of the 1979–80 season.

In 1980–81, Vilshofen was immedialtey promoted from the Landesliga back to the Bayernliga again. Back in the Bayernliga, the club finished in ninth place for two consecutive seasons. After this, fortunes declined and the side finished 13th and 17th in the following years, finding itself relegated from the league again after the later result.

The club also enjoyed a number of cup successes in this era, taking out the Lower Bavarian Cup in 1982, 1983 and 1984 after having qualified for the first round of the German Cup in 1979.

After relegation in 1985, the club spent another ten seasons at Landesliga level, initially as an upper table side but, in 1994–95, the team suffered another relegation, dropping out of the Landesliga for good.

Vilshofen now entered the Bezirksoberliga Niederbayern, where it became a mid-table side. Gradually, the club declined at this level, too, and suffered another relegation, now to the Bezirksliga, in 2001.

The following season, the club dropped even further, to the Kreisliga, but immediately recovered and returned to the Bezirksliga. After five seasons at this level, the team won a league championship and earned another promotion.

The club returned to the Bezirksoberliga in 2008 with a much better performance then it left it seven years before, finishing consistently in the top third of the league and coming second in 2009–10. At the end of the 2011–12 season the club qualified for the promotion round to the newly expanded Landesliga, after finishing eighth in the Bezirksoberliga. FCV qualified for the Landesliga after a 4–1 extra time win in the third round of the promotion play-offs.

The club lasted for only one season in the Landesliga, finishing on a relegation play-off rank and losing to TuS Pfarrkirchen in the relegation round. The following season it suffered relegation again, now to the Kreisliga.

Honours
The club's honours:

League
 Landesliga Bayern-Mitte
 Champions: 1978, 1981
 Bezirksoberliga Niederbayern
 Runners-up: 2010
 Bezirksliga Niederbayern-Ost
 Champions: 2008

Cup
 Niederbayern Cup
 Winner: 1982, 1983, 1984

Youth
 Bavarian Under 19 championship
 Runners-up: 1971, 1975

Recent seasons
The recent season-by-season performance of the club:

With the introduction of the Bezirksoberligas in 1988 as the new fifth tier, below the Landesligas, all leagues below dropped one tier. With the introduction of the Regionalligas in 1994 and the 3. Liga in 2008 as the new third tier, below the 2. Bundesliga, all leagues below dropped one tier. With the establishment of the Regionalliga Bayern as the new fourth tier in Bavaria in 2012 the Bayernliga was split into a northern and a southern division, the number of Landesligas expanded from three to five and the Bezirksoberligas abolished. All leagues from the Bezirksligas onward were elevated one tier.

DFB Cup appearances
The club has qualified for the first round of the German Cup just once:

References

External links
 Das deutsche Fußball-Archiv  historical German domestic league tables
 Manfreds Fussball Archiv  Tables and results from the Bavarian amateur leagues

Football clubs in Germany
Football clubs in Bavaria
Football in Lower Bavaria
Association football clubs established in 1919
1919 establishments in Germany
Passau (district)